William B. Goodenough (1863 – May 24, 1905) was a center fielder in Major League Baseball. He played for the St. Louis Browns in 1893.

References

External links

1863 births
1905 deaths
Major League Baseball center fielders
St. Louis Browns (NL) players
Baseball players from New York (state)
Sportspeople from Watertown, New York
19th-century baseball players
Omaha Omahogs players
Dallas Hams players
Galveston Giants players
Fort Worth Panthers players
Sacramento Altas players
Sacramento Senators players
St. Paul Apostles players
Duluth Whalebacks players
Missoula (minor league baseball) players
Tacoma Daisies players
Memphis Fever Germs players
Milwaukee Brewers (minor league) players
Memphis Giants players
Atlanta Crackers players
Buffalo Bisons (minor league) players
Richmond Giants players
Nashville Vols players